Vienna Airport is a railway station serving Vienna International Airport in Schwechat, Lower Austria, Austria. The train services are operated by ÖBB and Deutsche Bahn.

The station was opened in 1977 and was extensively rebuilt as part of the airport's Terminal 3 expansion and to allow long-distance traffic between 2003 and 2014.

Train services
The station is served by the following services:

Railjet (Bregenz –) (Innsbruck –) Salzburg – Linz – St. Pölten – Vienna Meidling station – Vienna Main Station – Vienna Airport (twice per hour)
Intercity (Klagenfurt –) (Saalfelden –) Salzburg – Wels – Linz – Amstetten - St. Pölten – Tullnerfeld - Vienna Meidling station – Vienna Main Station – Vienna Airport (hourly)
Local services (City Airport Train) Vienna Mitte station - Vienna Airport (twice per hour)
Vienna S-Bahn services  Vienna Floridsdorf station - Vienna Airport - Wolfsthal (twice per hour)

References

External links

Railway stations in Lower Austria
Airport railway stations
Railway stations opened in 1977
1977 establishments in Austria
Railway stations in Austria opened in the 20th century